Wilgehof is a South African  suburb of the city of Bloemfontein in South Africa. Properties here where municipal housing developments And as younger mixed new owners invest and do upgrading the low value previously has increased this is also the most central of the city. Schools and large shopping groups. Very low crime area with and the service fees and levies on properties are fairly low. Verify good for prospective buyers.

References

 www.cunninghamrealestate.co.za

Suburbs of Bloemfontein